Burno is a surname. Notable people with the surname include: 

Dwayne Burno (1970–2013), American jazz bassist
Rashon Burno (born 1978), American basketball coach

See also
Burne